Mariaville Historic District is a national historic district located at Duanesburg in Schenectady County, New York. The district includes seven contributing buildings along the northwest shore of Mariaville Lake near the Chuctanunda Creek.  It encompasses five residences, one church (First Presbyterian Church of Duanesburg), one commercial building (Silas Marsh General Store), and five outbuildings.  The buildings date from the 1830s to 1850s and are representative of the Greek Revival style.

The property was covered in a 1984 study of Duanesburg historical resources.
It was listed on the National Register of Historic Places in 1984.

References

Historic districts on the National Register of Historic Places in New York (state)
Greek Revival architecture in New York (state)
Historic districts in Schenectady County, New York
National Register of Historic Places in Schenectady County, New York